Lauri Denise Johnson (née Smith; born December 27, 1949) is an American character actress.

Early life
Johnson was born in Santa Monica, California, in 1949. She is the daughter of vocalist Annette Warren and jazz pianist Paul Smith.

Career 
Johnson's first prominent role was providing additional voices to the Hanna-Barbera cartoon The Jetsons. She began landing small bit roles in the movies City of Angels and The Negotiator and later appeared in episodes of several popular television shows.

Filmography

Film

Television

References

External links

1949 births
Actresses from Santa Monica, California
Living people
21st-century American women